Barry M. Rubin (28 January 1950 – February 3, 2014) was an American-born Israeli writer and academic on terrorism and Middle Eastern affairs.

Career
Rubin was the director of the Global Research in International Affairs (GLORIA) Center, editor of the Middle East Review of International Affairs (MERIA) and a professor at the Interdisciplinary Center (IDC) in Herzliya, Israel. He was the editor of the GLORIA center website. The GLORIA center has since been renamed to the Rubin Center in his honor. He was also editor of the journal Turkish Studies. 

His book Israel: An Introduction was published by Yale University Press in 2012.  Rubin's more recent books include: 

 The Israel-Arab Reader, 
 The Long War for Freedom: The Arab Struggle for Democracy in the Middle East, and 
 The Truth About Syria. 

His latest book, entitled Silent Revolution (2014), describes how the Left rose to political power and cultural dominance in the USA during the recent years.

Media
Rubin was a guest on  This Week with David Brinkley, Nightline, Face the Nation, The MacNeil-Lehrer NewsHour, The Larry King Show, and others on CBS News, CNN, Fox News, and MSNBC.  Among the newspapers around the world for which he has written are La Vanguardia in Spain, the Frankfurter Allgemeine Zeitung in Germany; The National Post and The Globe and Mail in Canada; La Opinión, Liberal Forum, and Limes in Italy; The Age, The Australian, The Sydney Morning Herald, and The Australian Financial Review in Australia; Zaman, Referans, and Radikal in Turkey; and The Pioneer in India.  Rubin was a frequent contributor to the Middle East column in The Jerusalem Post. His Rubin Reports columns dating back to November, 2011 appeared in The Jewish Press.

Personal life
Rubin was born in Washington, D.C., and was married to Judith Colp Rubin. He died on February 3, 2014, in Tel Aviv after an 18-month battle with lung cancer.

References

External links 
 Rubin Center where  free full-text books can be read online or downloaded. 
  Retrieved October 20, 2017.
 

1950 births
2014 deaths
20th-century American Jews
American emigrants to Israel
Israeli anti-communists
Israeli Jews
Academic staff of Reichman University
Johns Hopkins University people
Georgetown University faculty
People from Washington, D.C.
Deaths from lung cancer
21st-century American Jews